Karangnongko is an administrative district in Indonesia. It is located in the Klaten Regency in Central Java.

Klaten Regency
Districts of Central Java